Born for This can refer to:

 "Born for This", 2007 song from Riot! by Paramore
 "Born for This", 2019 song from Naive by Andy Grammer
 "Born for This", 2019 song by The Score
 Born for This!, 2004 album and its title track by Stephanie Mills